Return to Nuke 'Em High Volume 1 is a 2013 American science-fiction horror comedy film directed by Lloyd Kaufman. The film, produced by the cult classic B-movie production group Troma Entertainment, is the fourth in the Nuke 'Em High film series.

Premise
In Tromaville High School the glee club has mutated into a vicious gang called The Cretins. Chrissy and Lauren, two innocent bloggers, must fight not only the Cretins, mutants and monsters but also the evil Tromorganic Foodstuffs Conglomerate.

Cast

 Asta Paredes as Chrissy
 Catherine Corcoran as Lauren
 Vito Trigo as Leonardo
 Clay von Carlowitz as Eugene
 Zac Amico as Zac
 Stefan Dezil as Slater
 Gabriela Fuhr as Kelly
 Mark Quinnette as Michelangelo
 Mike Baez as Donatello
 Ron Mackay as Coach Sandusky
 Reiki Tsuno as Rembrandt
 Tara E. Miller as Rachel Ruysch
 Jim Sheppard as Raphael
 Lemmy as the President
 Lloyd Kaufman as Lee Harvey Herzkauf
 Babette Bombshell as Principal Westly
 William Dreyer as Arnold
 Adam P. Murphy as Mr. Chips
 Brenda Rickert as Aunt Bee
 Dan Snow as Cigar Face
 Debbie Rochon as Coach Kotter
 The World Champion as the World Champion
 Mark Kaufman as Kabukicar passenger
 Sam Qualiana as Bully
 Andrew Elias as Tromaville citizen (uncredited)
 Stan Lee credited as Peter Parker as the Narrator

Production

Development
A fourth Nuke 'Em High film entitled Battle of the Bikini Subhumanoids was initially announced in 1996. Troma ran a script-writing contest that invited fans to contribute two pages with a weekly winner announced and added to the collective screenplay.  Despite a script being finished in 2000, this project never got past the pre-production stage.

Troma again announced production of the sequel in October 2011. Initially, it was stated the film would be made in Spain by Mushnik's Entertainment in collaboration with Chaparra Entertainment. The directors were to be Marc Gras and Dani Moreno. The plot centered around a new group of Cretins who are forced into the role of the protagonists. However, this version also never came to fruition.

After Anchor Bay had shown interest in remaking some of the films from Troma's library, Troma started talking to them about doing a co-production. Anchor Bay ended up remaking Troma's Mother's Day while serving as co-producers on a Class of Nuke 'Em High reboot, which became the fourth installment of the Nuke 'Em High series during pre-production.

Filming
Kaufman began production anew in 2012, directing the film himself in New York and New Jersey. Casting took place throughout June 2012. For the first time, Troma relied on Kickstarter to raise a small amount of funds to support "animal actor" Kevin the Duck.  Principal photography began in August 2012 and finished in September.

Release
Initially slated to be a single installment, Kaufman split the film into two volumes, much like The Toxic Avengers 2 and 3, after director Quentin Tarantino’s suggestion, à la Kill Bill.

Return to Nuke 'Em High Volume 1 began a limited North American theatrical release in the fall of 2013, beginning with a screening at the Museum of Modern Art.  It expanded in January 2014.

Critical reception
Reviews were generally mixed. On review aggregator website Rotten Tomatoes, the film received an approval rating of 57% based on 14 reviews, with an average rating of 5/10. On Metacritic, the film has a weighted average score of 40 out of 100 based on 8 critics, indicating "mixed or average reviews".

Variety deemed it "a hearty blast of Troma-branded schlock" while The New York Times said Kaufman fans "will be delighted to learn that time has eroded neither his love of nudity nor his disdain for political correctness." The New York Post praised the film for its "hilarious series of parodies: Carrie, Soylent Green, Glee, Cat Ballou, you name it." Horror magazine Fangoria gave the film 3.5 out of 4 skulls, calling it "undeniably funny, brave and so unlike anything put out today that it practically demands respect."

Sequel
Kaufman shot Return to Return to Nuke 'Em High AKA Volume 2 with Paredes, Corcoran, and Amico reprising their leading roles. A Kickstarter campaign was set up to raise $50,000 for post-production costs. The campaign ended on June 24, 2015, successfully raising $63,615. The sequel premiered at the Cannes Film Festival in May 2017, with a Los Angeles premiere on March 8, 2018 at the Ahrya Fine Arts Theater in Beverly Hills, California. The movie will be released on Blu-ray on November 12, 2019.

References

External links
 
 
 
 
 Official Return to Nuke 'Em High: Volume 2 Kickstarter page

2013 films
2010s English-language films
2010s comedy horror films
2013 LGBT-related films
2010s science fiction films
American comedy horror films
American science fiction comedy films
American independent films
American LGBT-related films
American satirical films
American science fiction horror films
Bisexuality-related films
Films directed by Lloyd Kaufman
Films set in New Jersey
Films shot in New Jersey
Films shot in New York (state)
Lesbian-related films
Punk films
American sequel films
Troma Entertainment films
2013 comedy films
2010s American films